The One and Only is the third studio album of Lefty Frizzell released in 1959. The album is the last studio album of Frizzell's to be released in the 1950s (when he had his most success). It includes many of his fan favorites and most successful songs of the 1950s, including "If You've Got the Money (I've Got the Time)", "Always Late (With Your Kisses)", "I Love You a Thousand Ways", and "Mom and Dad's Waltz".

Track listing

1959 albums
Lefty Frizzell albums